Statistics of Armenian Premier League in the 1999 season.

 Zvartnots-AAL FC are promoted.
 Aragats FC changed their name to FC Gyumri.

League table

Results

First half of season

Second half of season

Promotion/relegation play-off

Top goalscorers

See also
 1999 in Armenian football
 1999 Armenian First League
 1999 Armenian Cup

Armenian Premier League seasons
1
Armenia
Armenia